Commander-in-Chief, Andaman and Nicobar Command (CINCAN) is the head of the Andaman and Nicobar Command, the first and only Tri-service theater command of the Indian Armed Forces, based at Port Blair in the Andaman and Nicobar Islands, a Union Territory of India.

The current CINCAN is Lieutenant General Ajai Singh  AVSM who took command on 1 June 2021 as the 16th CINCAN.

History
The Andaman and Nicobar Islands became a Union territory of India in 1956. The first military unit on the islands was the naval base INS Jarawa which was commissioned in 1964. The base was commanded by a Resident Naval Officer (RNO). With the establishment of subsequent garrisons in the islands, the post was upgraded to Naval Officer-in-charge Andaman & Nicobar (NOIC A&N). The naval establishments were under the command of the Eastern Naval Command during the Indo-Pakistani War of 1971. In October 1976, the operational control of all forces in the islands was given and the post was upgraded to Commodore, Andaman & Nicobar (COMAN). Shortly afterward, to signify jointness, all establishments came under the newly created Fortress Andaman & Nicobar. The appointment was re-designated to Fortress Commander, Andaman & Nicobar (FORTAN). In 1978, INS Kardip was commissioned as a Forward operating base.

In March 1981, FORTAN was upgraded to a Two star appointment tenanted by a Rear Admiral. In 1987, the post was further upgraded to a three star appointment. In 1998, a 'Far East Naval Command' (FENC) was proposed, to be commanded by a Flag Officer Commanding-in-Chief Far East Naval Command.

With the operationalisation of the A & N Command as a unified theatre command in October 2001, Vice Admiral Arun Prakash,  took over as the First Commander-in-Chief of the unified command.

Organisation
The CINCAN is a Three-star rank officer from the three Services in rotation. The CINCAN reports directly to the Chief of Defence Staff (India) (CDS) in New Delhi. He is assisted by the Chief of Staff of the command, a two-star officer and the commanders of each component (sea, land, air) - one-star officers.

List of Commanders
The following is a list of Commanders-in-Chief of the A&N command.

List of CINCAN by branches of service
Army - 6
Navy - 7
Air Force - 3

See also
 Chairman of the Chiefs of Staff Committee
 Chief of Integrated Defence Staff
 Andaman and Nicobar Command

References

Bibliography

External links
 Official Website - CINCAN

Indian Army
Indian Navy
Indian Air Force
Indian military appointments